Karla-Simone Spence (born 19 July 1996) is a British actress. She is best known for her roles in the film Blue Story (2019) and the ITVX period drama The Confessions of Frannie Langton (2022). She also appeared in the BBC series Gold Digger (2019) and Wannabe (2018).

Early life
Spence was born in South London. She is of Jamaican descent. She found her love for acting when she was 11 years old after she starred as Joseph in Joseph And The Amazing Technicolor Dreamcoat in her primary school's production. Spence attended Haberdashers' Hatcham College in New Cross. She is the older sister of English footballer Djed Spence.

Career
Spence made her television debut in 2018 when she played Amber in the BBC Three short-form sitcom Wannabe. The following year, she starred as Cali Okello in the BBC One miniseries Gold Digger and one of the lead roles, Leah in the film Blue Story, The film received critical acclaim and earned her nominations at the National Film Awards.

In August 2021, it was announced that Spence would star as the titular role of Frannie Langton in the period drama The Confessions of Frannie Langton, an ITV adaptation of the novel of the same name by Sara Collins. The limited series premiered on ITVX in December 2022 and in March 2023 on britbox and she has received critical acclaim for her performance.

In April 2022, Spence made her professional stage debut in House of Ife at Bush Theatre.

Filmography

Film

Television

Stage

Short film

Awards and nominations

References

External links
 
 

1996 births
Living people
21st-century English actresses
Actresses from London
Black British actresses
English people of Jamaican descent
English people of Kenyan descent
People from the London Borough of Lambeth